Giovanni Büttner (born 22 September 1998) is a Dutch professional footballer who plays as an attacking midfielder or left winger. He is the cousin of fellow footballer Alexander Büttner.

Career
Born in Doetinchem, Büttner played for Vitesse at youth level before joining the academy of Go Ahead Eagles in 2015. Büttner made his debut for Go Ahead Eagles on 31 October 2018, coming on as a substitute in a 3–0 defeat at AFC Ajax in the KNVB Cup, before making his league debut in the Eerste Divisie against TOP Oss on 22 April 2019.

In the summer of 2019, Büttner joined fellow Eerste Divisie club TOP Oss.

References

External links
 
 

1998 births
Living people
Dutch footballers
Association football wingers
Association football midfielders
People from Doetinchem
Go Ahead Eagles players
TOP Oss players
Eerste Divisie players
Footballers from Gelderland